Ernie Afaganis (born ) is a Canadian sports broadcaster, known for his work at CBC Sports. He was born in Lethbridge, Alberta.

Career
After graduating with a Bachelor of Arts from Eastern Washington University, Afaganis returned to Alberta where in 1953 he joined CFRN in Edmonton. In 1961, he joined CBC Television at CBXT, also in Edmonton.

From there, he gained prominence as a sportscaster on CBC's national service. He was host of CBC's Sports Weekend programme in its debut season. He was also a sideline reporter for the CFL on CBC.

Awards and recognition
In 1977 he was inducted into the Alberta Sports Hall of Fame. In November 2007, he was inducted into the CBC Sports Hall of Fame. In 1988, he was inducted to the Football Reporters of Canada hall of fame, a journalistic honour associated with the Canadian Football Hall of Fame.

Shows
Afaganis was a host of the following CBC Television programmes:

 Tee to Green (1970)
 Snow Motion (1978)
 Canadian Superstars (1978–1981)
 Par 27 (1978–1980)

References

External links
 

1920s births
Living people
Year of birth uncertain
Canadian Football Hall of Fame inductees
Canadian Football League announcers
Canadian television sportscasters
CBC Television people
Eastern Washington University alumni
Gymnastics broadcasters
Olympic Games broadcasters
Sportspeople from Lethbridge